Anthony Davies (born 1969) is a Welsh snooker player.

Anthony or Tony Davies may also refer to:

Tony Davies (1939–2008), New Zealand rugby player
Tony Davies (priest) (born 1946), Archdeacon of Croydon
Anthony Mark Davies (cricketer, born 1980)
Anthony Davies, fictional character on Australian soap opera Neighbours

See also
Anthony Davis (disambiguation)
Tony Davis (disambiguation)